Egyptian English Language School (EELS) is a private school in Alexandria, Egypt. It was founded in 2002 and offers: national education, IGCSE and American Diploma.

References

External links 

Official website

British international schools in Egypt
Private schools in Alexandria
International schools in Alexandria
Educational institutions established in 2002
2002 establishments in Egypt